Vrydagzynea, commonly called tonsil orchids, is a genus of orchids in the tribe Cranichideae. About forty five species of Vrydagzynea have been formally described. They are native to India, Taiwan, Southeast Asia, Malesia, Melanesia and Polynesia. A single species in Australia is possibly extinct. They have thinly textured, stalked leaves and small, dull-coloured resupinate flowers with the dorsal sepal and petals overlapping to form a hood over the column.

Description
Orchids in the genus Vrydagzynea are terrestrial, perennial, deciduous, sympodial herbs with a fleshy, creeping, above-ground rhizome anchored by wiry roots. The leaves are thinly textured and stalked, arranged in a rosette at the base of the flowering stem or scattered along it. Small, resupinate dull-coloured flowers are crowded along the short flowering stem which usually has protruding bracts. The dorsal sepal and petals overlap, forming a hood over the column. The labellum has a downward pointing spur and two stalked glands that resemble tonsils or testicles. Orchids in this genus are distinguished from those in other similar genera by the labellum glands, labellum spur and by having petals which are shorter than the sepals.

Taxonomy and naming
The genus Vrydagzynea was first formally described in 1858 by Carl Ludwig Blume and the description was published in his book Collection des Orchidées les plus remarquables de l'archipel Indien et du Japon. The name Vrydagzynea honours the Dutch pharmacologist Theodore Daniel Vrydag Zynen, a contemporary of Blume.

List of species
The following is a list of species of Vrydagzynea recognised by the World Checklist of Selected Plant Families as at October 2020:

 Vrydagzynea albida (Blume) Blume - Bangladesh to New Guinea, Indochina, Indonesia, Philippines, Nicobar Islands
 Vrydagzynea albostriata Schltr. in K.M.Schumann & C.A.G.Lauterbach - New Guinea
 Vrydagzynea angustisepala J.J.Sm. - Borneo
 Vrydagzynea argentistriata Carr - Sabah
 Vrydagzynea argyrotaenia Schltr. in K.M.Schumann & C.A.G.Lauterbach - New Guinea, Solomon Islands, Vanuatu
 Vrydagzynea beccarii Schltr. - Sarawak
 Vrydagzynea bicostata Carr - Sabah
 Vrydagzynea bractescens Ridl. - Sumatra, Borneo
 Vrydagzynea brassii Ormerod - New Guinea
 Vrydagzynea buruensis J.J.Sm. - Sulawesi, Maluku
 Vrydagzynea celebica Schltr. - Sulawesi
 Vrydagzynea deliana J.J.Sm. - Sumatra
 Vrydagzynea densa Schltr. - New Guinea
 Vrydagzynea elata Schltr. - Sabah, Sarawak
 Vrydagzynea elongata Blume - New Guinea, Maluku and Queensland
 Vrydagzynea endertii J.J.Sm. - Borneo
 Vrydagzynea formosana Hayata - Assam, China, Vietnam, Japan
 Vrydagzynea gracilis Blume - Java, Sumatra
 Vrydagzynea grandis Ames & C.Schweinf. in O.Ames - Sabah
 Vrydagzynea guppyi Schltr. - Solomon Islands
 Vrydagzynea kerintjiensis J.J.Sm - Sumatra
 Vrydagzynea lancifolia Ridl. - Thailand, Malaysia, Borneo
 Vrydagzynea micronesiaca Schltr. - Pohnpei
 Vrydagzynea neohibernica Schltr. - Bismarck Archipelago
 Vrydagzynea novaguineensis J.J.Sm. - New Guinea
 Vrydagzynea nuda Blume - Hainan, Hong Kong, Taiwan, Vietnam, Borneo, Java
 Vrydagzynea obliqua Schltr. - Sulawesi
 Vrydagzynea paludosa J.J.Sm. - Queensland, New Guinea, Solomon Islands
 Vrydagzynea pauciflora J.J.Sm. - Borneo
 Vrydagzynea purpurea Blume - Java
 Vrydagzynea salomonensis Schltr. in K.M.Schumann & C.A.G.Lauterbach - Vanuatu, Solomon Islands
 Vrydagzynea samoana Schltr - Vanuatu, Fiji, Samoa
 Vrydagzynea schumanniana Kraenzl. in K.M.Schumann & C.A.G.Lauterbach - New Guinea
 Vrydagzynea semicordata J.J.Sm. - Borneo
 Vrydagzynea sessilifolia Ormerod - New Guinea
 Vrydagzynea tilungensis J.J.Sm. - Borneo
 Vrydagzynea triangularis Ormerod & J.J.Wood - Sabah
 Vrydagzynea tristriata Ridl.  - Thailand, Malaysia, Borneo
 Vrydagzynea truncicola Schltr. - New Guinea
 Vrydagzynea uncinata Blume - Java
 Vrydagzynea vitiensis Rchb.f - Vanuatu, Fiji, Samoa, Tonga
 Vrydagzynea vrydagzynoides (Ames) Ormerod - Leyte
 Vrydagzynea weberi Ames - Philippines

See also 
 List of Orchidaceae genera

References 

 
Cranichideae genera